Burry Port harbour was built between 1830 and 1836 to replace the harbour at Pembrey, located 400 yards to the west. Burry Port was once the main coal exporting port for the nearby valleys, but the dock now houses the only marina in Carmarthenshire, and the harbour was dredged especially for this purpose.

History
Burry Port Lighthouse is a harbour light with a reflector, and is situated on the west breakwater of the outer harbour. It was built in 1842 and was erected with the permission of Trinity House and maintained at the joint expense of the proprietors of Burry Port Harbour and the Commissioners of the Burry Navigation. The light consists of a 24 ft white painted, stone, circular tower with a black gallery and red lantern. 
As this was a harbour light, the annual cost of its upkeep, which cost £32 in 1844, was not met by a direct charge to shipping. However, in 1845 the superintendent of Burry Port Harbour reported that buoyage dues not exceeding 1d a ton had been regularly charged since the passing of an Act for the ‘Improvement of the Navigation of the Rivers Bury, Loughor and Lliedi’ on 2 July 1813.

In 1995-6, Llanelli Borough Training, with the support of the Burry Port Yacht Club, restored the lighthouse and Trinity House donated a new light. The restored lighthouse is operated by Carmarthenshire County Council and was formally opened on 9 February 1996 by Councillor David T. James, the Mayor of Llanelli. The lighthouse is accessed via the breakwater.
The neighbouring small port of Pembrey Old Harbour also had a lighthouse to guide ships into port. Prior to its construction, the tall chimneys of Court Farm, Pembrey were used as a navigation aid. The lighthouse was used in 2022 as the centrepiece of events in S4C sci-fi drama series Y Goleudy.

See also

 List of lighthouses in Wales

References

External links

 Carmarthenshire County Council

Lighthouses completed in 1842
Lighthouses in Wales
Buildings and structures in Carmarthenshire
Grade II listed lighthouses
Grade II listed buildings in Carmarthenshire
1842 establishments in the United Kingdom
Burry Port